Barbara Edelpöck (died 1495) was the mistress of Matthias Corvinus, King of Hungary. She gave birth to the King's only, although illegitimate, child, John Corvinus.

Life
Barbara Edelpöck was a daughter of a citizen of Stein in Lower Austria. She met the King in early 1470.

Notes

Sources

1495 deaths
Year of birth missing
Mistresses of Hungarian royalty
Mistresses of Bohemian royalty
15th-century Austrian women
15th-century Hungarian women